Presidential elections were held in Austria on 18 May 1980. Supported by both major parties, the ruling Socialist Party and opposition Austrian People's Party, incumbent president Rudolf Kirchschläger was re-elected with a landslide of 80% of the vote. The competing candidates were Willfried Gredler of the Freedom Party of Austria and Norbert Burger of the National Democratic Party, which was later banned.

Results

References

Presidential elections in Austria
President
Austria
Austria